Gol-e Sorkh or Gol Sorkh may refer to:
Gol-e Sorkh, Chaharmahal and Bakhtiari, a village
Gol-e Sorkh, Kerman, a village
Kol-e Sorkh Yeydi, a village
Gol-e-Sorkh Square, a square